The politics of Kyrgyzstan, officially known as the Kyrgyz Republic, takes place in the framework of a presidential system representative democratic republic, whereby the President is head of state and the Chairman of the Cabinet of Ministers is head of government. Executive power is exercised by the government. Legislative power is vested in both the government and parliament. 

Unlike its authoritarian neighbors – Kazakhstan, Tajikistan, Turkmenistan, and Uzbekistan – Kyrgyzstan has had a more pluralistic political system since the collapse of the Soviet Union. Kyrgyzstan has swung between authoritarian and democratic forms of government. Three authoritarian presidents have been ousted from office since 2005 due to popular protests.

Political history
In the first years of Kyrgyzstan's full independence, President Askar Akayev appeared wholeheartedly committed to the reform process. However, despite the backing of major Western donors, including the International Monetary Fund (IMF), Kyrgyzstan had consequential economic difficulties from the outset. These came mainly as a result of the breakup of the Soviet trade bloc, which impeded the Republic's smooth transfer to a free-market economy.

In 1993, allegations of corruption against Akayev's closest political associates blossomed into a major scandal. One of those accused of improprieties was Vice President Feliks Kulov, who resigned for ethical reasons in December. Following Kulov's resignation, Akayev dismissed the government and called upon the last communist premier, Apas Djumagulov, to form a new one. In January 1994, Akayev initiated a referendum asking for a renewed mandate to complete his term of office. He received 96.2% of the vote.

A new Constitution was passed by the Parliament in May 1993. In 1994, however, the Parliament failed to produce a quorum for its last scheduled session prior to the expiration of its term (February 1995). President Akayev was widely accused of having manipulated a boycott by a majority of the parliamentarians. Akayev, in turn, asserted that the communists had caused a political crisis by preventing the legislature from fulfilling its role. Akayev scheduled an October 1994 referendum, overwhelmingly approved by voters, that proposed two amendments to the Constitution, one that would allow the Constitution to be amended by means of a referendum, and the other creating a new bicameral parliament called the Jogorku Keņesh.

Elections for the two legislative chambers – a 35-seat full-time assembly and a 70-seat part-time assembly – were held in February 1995 after campaigns considered remarkably free and open by most international observers, although the election-day proceedings were marred by widespread irregularities. Independent candidates won most of the seats, suggesting that personalities prevailed over ideologies. The new Parliament convened its initial session in March 1995. One of its first orders of business was the approval of the precise constitutional language on the role of the legislature.

Kyrgyzstan's independent political parties competed in the 1996 parliamentary elections. A February 1996 referendum – in violation of the Constitution and the law on referendums – amended the Constitution to give President Akayev more power. It also removed the clause that parliamentarians be directly elected by universal suffrage. Although the changes gave the President the power to dissolve Parliament, it also more clearly defined Parliament's powers. Since that time, Parliament has demonstrated real independence from the executive branch.

An October 1998 referendum approved constitutional changes, including increasing the number of deputies in the upper house, reducing the number of deputies in the lower house, rolling back Parliamentary immunity, reforming land tender rules, and reforming the state budget.

Two rounds of Parliamentary elections were held on 20 February 2000 and 12 March 2000. With the full backing of the United States, the Organization for Security and Co-operation in Europe (OSCE) reported that the elections failed to comply with commitments to free and fair elections and hence were invalid. Questionable judicial proceedings against opposition candidates and parties limited the choice of candidates available to Kyrgyz voters, while state-controlled media reported favorably on official candidates only and government officials put pressure on independent media outlets that favored the opposition.

In 2002 Azimbek Beknazarov, a leading opposition figure, was imprisoned by the local authorities, in what many believe to be politically motivated circumstances. This led to protests resulting in clashes with police forces, culminating in the death of five people in Jalal-Abad.

As May approached the authorities further extended their hold on power, imprisoning the vocal former presidential ally, Feliks Kulov, to ten years for alleged "abuses of office". During the same month the entire government resigned, accepting blame for the loss of life during the protests earlier in the year. A new government led by Nikolay Tanayev was then formed.

In November the President faced yet more protests, as the opposition announced it would march on the capital and demand his resignation. The police reacted by arresting large amounts of demonstrators, further adding to international disapproval at the authoritarian nature of Akayev's government.

By June 2003, the lower house of Parliament announced that President Akayev and two other leaders of Kyrgyzstan, from the Soviet era, would be given lifetime immunity from prosecution, raising the prospect of Akayev finally stepping down.

In 2005, following disputed results of the 2005 parliamentary elections, Kyrgyzstan was thrown into a state of political turmoil, with different parties claiming that they were the legitimate government. On 10 July 2005 interim President and opposition People's Movement leader Kurmanbek Bakiyev won the presidential election in a landslide victory. (See: Tulip Revolution).

In 2006, Bakiyev faced a political crisis as thousands of people demonstrated in a series of protests in Bishkek. They accused him of reneging on promised constitutional reforms limiting presidential power and giving more authority to the parliament and cabinet. They also accused him of failing to eradicate corruption, crime, and poverty. Bakiyev in turn accused the opposition of plotting a coup against him. Several parliamentarians had been killed during the political unrest.

Presidential elections, originally expected in 2010, were rescheduled for 23 July 2009. President Bakiyev was widely expected to retain his mandate, while the opposition United People's Movement (OND) announced on 20 April 2009 that it would field a single candidate – Social Democratic Party leader Almaz Atambayev. The election turnout was reported at 79.3%. As of 00:45 local time in Kyrgyzstan on 25 July 2009 (with 2058 of 2330 polling districts reporting), Bakiyev had won the election with 83.8% of the vote.

In assessing the election, the OSCE stated that Bakiyev had gained an "unfair advantage" and that media bias "did not allow voters to make an informed choice." Additionally, they found that the election was "marred by many problems and irregularities", citing ballot stuffing and problems with the counting of votes. On polling day Atambayev withdrew his candidacy claiming widespread fraud, stating "due to massive, unprecedented violations, we consider these elections illegitimate and a new election should be held." An opposition rally of 1,000 people in Balykchy on election day was broken up by riot police.

The arrest of an opposition figure on 6 April 2010 in the town of Talas led opposition supporters to protest. The protestors took control of a governmental building, demanding a new government. Riot police were sent from Bishkek, and managed to temporarily regain control of the building. Later the same day several more opposition figures were arrested, while the government claimed to have regained control of the situation. The following day, however, hundreds of opposition supporters gathered in Bishkek and marched on the government headquarters. Security personnel attempted to disperse the protestors with the use of stun grenades and live rounds, at the cost of dozens of lives. The protests continued, however, resulting in the flight of President Bakiyev to his southern stronghold of Jalalabad, and the freeing later the same day of the arrested opposition figures. A new government was formed under opposition leader Roza Otunbayeva, while Bakiyev remained for several days in southern Kyrgyzstan, before fleeing to Belarus, where he was given asylum by President Lukashenko. The new interim government held consultations on a new constitution, intended to increase the powers of the parliament and reduce those of the president. A referendum was held on the resulting document on 27 June 2010, and was approved by over 90% of voters, with a turnout of 72%. Elections were subsequently held on 10 October 2010. These elections resulted in five parties reaching the 5% threshold necessary to enter parliament.

Presidential elections were held in 2011, resulting in the victory of Almazbek Atambayev. In 2017, he endorsed Prime minister Sooronbay Jeenbekov for President, who won that year's presidential contest. After Atambayev retired from presidency, he began criticizing Jeenbekov and their relations worsened over time. Soon Atambayev was accused of corruption by the Jeenbekov administration. Clashes grew between security forces and Atambayev supporters, exacerbating political turmoil. Political insurgency in Kyrgyzstan amplified following controversy about the conduct of October 2020 Kyrgyz parliamentary election, where only four parties met the 7% threshold to achieve parliamentary representation, three of whom were closely aligned with the government. Opposition supporters claimed that these elections were tainted by vote buying and many other forms of irregularities. The protests resulted in en masse resignation of government officials. In October 2020, President Sooronbay Jeenbekov resigned after protests caused by irregularities in parliamentary elections on 4 October 2020. In January 2021, Sadyr Japarov was elected as the new president after winning the presidential election by landslide.

In April 2021, the majority of voters approved in the constitutional referendum a new constitution that would give new powers to the president, strengthening significantly the presidency.

Executive branch

|President
|Sadyr Japarov
|Mekenchil
|28 January 2021
|-
|Chairman of the Cabinet of Ministers
|Akylbek Japarov
|Ar-Namys
|12 October 2021
|}

The president is elected by popular vote for a maximum of two five-year terms. The chairman of the Cabinet of Ministers is appointed by the president and approved by the Supreme Council.

Cabinet of Ministers

Akylbek Japarov Government
Since 13 October 2021:

Chairman of the cabinet of ministers – Akylbek Japarov
First Deputy Chairman – Arzybek Kojoshev
Deputy Chairman – Edil Baisalov
Deputy Chairman – Bakyt Torobaev
Deputy Chairman, Head of SCNS – Kamchybek Tashiev
Minister of Foreign Affairs – Jeenbek Kulubaev
Minister of Agriculture – Askar Janybekov
Minister of Digital Development – Talantbek Imanov
Minister of the Economy – Daniyar Amangeldiev
Minister of Education and Science – Almazbek Beishenaliev
Minister of Emergency Situations – Boobek Ajikeev
Minister of Culture, Information and Tourism – Azamat Jamankulov
Minister of Finance – Almaz Baketaev
Minister of Health Care – Jarkynbek Kasymbekov
Minister of Internal Affairs – Ulan Niyazbekov
Minister of Justice – Ayaz Baetov
Minister of Transport and Communication – Erkinbek Osoev
Minister of Energy – Doskul Bekmurzaev
Minister of Labor, Welfare and Migration – Kudaibergen Bazarbaev
Minister of Defence – Baktybek Bekbolotov
Minister of Natural Resources, Environment and Technical Supervision – Dinara Kutmanova

Legislative branch

In the Soviet era, Kyrgyzstan had a unicameral legislature which was replaced in 1995 by the bicameral Supreme Council (Joghorku Keneš). The Supreme Council consisted of the Assembly of People's Representatives (45 seats; members were elected by popular vote from single member constituencies) and the Legislative Assembly (60 seats; 45 members of which were elected by popular vote from single member constituencies, and 15 of which were from national party lists on a proportional basis with a 5% threshold). All legislative terms were five years.

In 2005, as part of the 2005 election process and in accordance with a 2003 referendum, the Parliament again became unicameral. The Legislative Assembly (Myizam Chygaruu Jyiyny) had 75 members, elected for five-year terms from single-seat constituencies.

However, because of the political unrest, a new constitutional referendum was held on 21 October 2007 which approved a new electoral system, enlarged the parliament to 90 members and introducing party-list voting. Party-list voting is a proportional representation system of voting, where candidates are selected from central party lists rather than locally elected. Early parliamentary elections were held on 16 December 2007.

Political parties and elections

2017 presidential elections

2015 parliamentary elections

Political pressure groups and leaders
 Council of Free Trade Unions
 Kyrgyz Committee on Human Rights – Ramazan Dyryldayev
 National Unity Democratic Movement
 Union of Entrepreneurs
 Central Asian Free Market Institute

Judicial branch

Although the constitution provides for an independent judiciary, Kyrgyzstan's court system is widely seen as under the influence of the prosecutor's office. Low salaries make the bribery of judges commonplace. Most cases originate in local courts; they then can move via the appeals process to municipal or regional courts, with the Supreme Court the final court of appeals. Property and family law disputes and low-level criminal cases are heard by traditional elders' courts, which are loosely supervised by the prosecutor's office. Economic disputes and military cases are heard in specialized courts. The constitutional amendments of 2003 expanded the scope of the Supreme Court in civil, criminal, and administrative proceedings. Many protections of Western jurisprudence are not present in Kyrgyzstan's system, which retains many features of the Soviet system. The right to counsel and the presumption of innocence of the accused are guaranteed by law but often not practiced. There is no trial by jury. Reform legislation under consideration in 2006 would establish a jury system and bolster the independence of the judicial branch.

The Prosecutor General's Office of Kyrgyzstan oversees the enforcement of the Kyrgyz legal system and the activities of law enforcement agencies and the sentencing of criminals in concert with the judiciary.

Administrative divisions
Kyrgyzstan is divided into seven Regions (oblustar, singular – oblus) and two region-level cities* (shaar):
 Batken Region (Batken)
 Bishkek*
 Chüy Region (Bishkek)
 Issyk-Kul Region (Karakol)
 Jalal-Abad Region (Jalal-Abad)
 Naryn Region (Naryn)
 Osh*
 Osh Region (Osh)
 Talas Region (Talas)
note: administrative center names in parentheses

International organization participation
AsDB
CIS
EAPC
EBRD
ECO
FAO
IBRD
ICAO
ICCt (signatory)
ICRM
IDA
IDB 
IFAD
IFC
IFRCS
ILO
IMF
INOGATE
Interpol
IOC
IOM
ISO (correspondent)
ITU
NAM (observer)
OIC
OPCW
OSCE 
PCA
PFP
SCO
UN
UNAMSIL
UNCTAD (UNECE)
United Nations Economic Commission for Europe
UNESCO
UNIDO
UNMIK
UPU
WCO
WFTU
WHO
WIPO
WMO
WToO
WTO
UNICEF

Notes

External links
Erik Herron's Guide to Politics in East Central Europe and Eurasia 
Kyrgyz Report offers ongoing analysis, including an analysis of the clusters of political forces in the country and the roots of the country’s political problems
Government of Kyrgyz Republic

 

bn:কিরগিজিস্তান#রাজনীতি